Operation Barricade was a British Commando raid during the Second World War. It was carried out by 11  men of No. 62 Commando over the night of 14/15 August 1942, and had as its objective an anti-aircraft gun and radar site north-west of Pointe de Saire south of Barfleur. The raiders crossed the English Channel by Motor Torpedo Boat. 

They opened fire on a German patrol killing three and wounding six, before withdrawing without loss to the Commandos.

References

Binney, Marcus (2006). Secret War Heroes. Hodder and Stoughton. .

Conflicts in 1942
World War II British Commando raids
1942 in France
Military history of Normandy